Shatareh (also Romanized as Shāţareh and Shāh Ţarreh) is a village in Bahramabad Rural District of the Central District of Eslamshahr County, Tehran province, Iran. At the 2006 National Census, its population was 9,477 in 2,315 households, when it was in Ahmadabad-e Mostowfi Rural District. The following census in 2011 counted 9,039 people in 2,476 households. The latest census in 2016 showed a population of 7,150 people in 2,183 households, by which time it was in the recently formed Bahramabad Rural District as its largest village.

References 

Eslamshahr County

Populated places in Tehran Province

Populated places in Eslamshahr County